Jens Birger Knudtzon (born 19 February 1936) is a retired Norwegian rower.

He was born in Oslo. Representing the club Bærum RK, he finished ninth in the coxed four event at the 1964 Summer Olympics.

References

1936 births
Living people
Norwegian male rowers
Olympic rowers of Norway
Rowers at the 1964 Summer Olympics
Sportspeople from Bærum